is a Japanese manga series written and illustrated by Taishi Mori.  It has been serialized in Shogakukan's Monthly Shōnen Sunday since November 2017.

Plot
Sagami is assigned to the Sales Planning Office and meets , a young scientist of the General Development Department. Sagami harbors feelings for Musubu, who is initially too focused on her work to return them.

Publication
Asoko de Hataraku Musubu-san is written and illustrated by Taishi Mori. The series began in Shogakukan's Monthly Shōnen Sunday on November 10, 2017. Shogakukan has collected its chapters into individual tankobon volumes. The first volume was released on October 12, 2018. As of December 12, 2022, five volumes have been released.

Volume list

Reception
In 2020, the manga was one of the 50 nominees for the 6th Next Manga Awards.

References

Further reading

External links
 

Romantic comedy anime and manga
Shogakukan manga
Shōnen manga